The IV postcode area, also known as the Inverness postcode area, is a group of 52 postcode districts for post towns: Achnasheen, Alness, Avoch, Beauly, Bonar Bridge, Cromarty, Dingwall, Dornoch, Elgin, Fochabers, Forres, Fortrose, Gairloch, Garve, Invergordon, Inverness, Isle of Skye, Kyle, Lairg, Lossiemouth, Muir of Ord, Munlochy, Nairn, Plockton, Portree, Rogart, Strathcarron, Strathpeffer, Strome Ferry, Tain and Ullapool in north Scotland.



Coverage
Approximate coverage of the postcode districts:

|-
! IV1
| INVERNESS
| Inverness centre and north, including the Longman, plus North Kessock and Kilmuir
| Highland
|-
! IV2
| INVERNESS
| Inverness east, plus Culloden, Balloch and Ardersier
| Highland
|-
! IV3
| INVERNESS
| Inverness west, plus Dochgarroch, Abriachan and Bunchrew
| Highland
|-
! IV4
| BEAULY
| Beauly, Kiltarlity, Struy, Cannich, Tomich
| Highland
|-
! IV5
| INVERNESS
| Kirkhill, Inchmore, Moniack and Cabrich
| Highland
|-
! IV6
| MUIR OF ORD
| Muir of Ord, Marybank, Strathconon
| Highland
|-
! IV7
| DINGWALL
| Conon Bridge, Culbokie, Maryburgh
| Highland
|-
! IV8
| MUNLOCHY
| Munlochy
| Highland
|-
! IV9
| AVOCH
| Avoch
| Highland
|-
! IV10
| FORTROSE
| Fortrose
| Highland
|-
! IV11
| CROMARTY
| Cromarty
| Highland
|-
! IV12
| NAIRN
| Auldearn
| Highland
|-
! IV13
| INVERNESS
| Tomatin
| Highland
|-
! IV14
| STRATHPEFFER
| Strathpeffer
| Highland
|-
! IV15
| DINGWALL
| Dingwall
| Highland
|-
! IV16
| DINGWALL
| Evanton
| Highland
|-
! IV17
| ALNESS
| Alness
| Highland
|-
! IV18
| INVERGORDON
| Invergordon
| Highland
|-
! IV19
| TAIN
| Tain, Nigg, Edderton
| Highland
|-
! IV20
| TAIN
| Hill of Fearn, Portmahomack, Balintore
| Highland
|-
! IV21
| GAIRLOCH
| Gairloch
| Highland
|-
! IV22
| ACHNASHEEN
| Achnasheen
| Highland
|-
! IV23
| GARVE
| Garve
| Highland
|-
! IV24
| ARDGAY 
| Bonar Bridge, Ardgay, Spinningdale, Culrain
| Highland
|-
! IV25
| DORNOCH
| Dornoch
| Highland
|-
! IV26
| ULLAPOOL
| Ullapool
| Highland
|-
! IV27
| LAIRG
| Lairg, Durness, Tongue, Scourie
| Highland
|-
! IV28
| ROGART
| Rogart
| Highland
|-
! IV30
| ELGIN
| Elgin
| Moray
|-
! IV31
| LOSSIEMOUTH
| Lossiemouth
| Moray
|-
! IV32
| FOCHABERS
| Fochabers
| Moray
|-
! IV36
| FORRES
| Forres
| Moray
|-
! IV40
| KYLE
| Kyle of Lochalsh, Raasay
| Highland
|-
! IV41
| ISLE OF SKYE
| Kyleakin
| Highland
|-
! IV42
| ISLE OF SKYE
| Breakish
| Highland
|-
! IV43
| ISLE OF SKYE
| Isle Ornsay
| Highland
|-
! IV44
| ISLE OF SKYE
| Teangue
| Highland
|-
! IV45
| ISLE OF SKYE
| Armadale, Upper Breakish
| Highland
|-
! IV46
| ISLE OF SKYE
| Tarskavaig
| Highland
|-
! IV47
| ISLE OF SKYE
| Carbost
| Highland
|-
! IV48
| ISLE OF SKYE
| Sconser
| Highland
|-
! IV49
| ISLE OF SKYE
| Broadford
| Highland
|-
! IV51
| PORTREE
| Portree, Uig
| Highland
|-
! IV52
| PLOCKTON
| Plockton
| Highland
|-
! IV53
| STROME FERRY
| Strome Ferry
| Highland
|-
! IV54
| STRATHCARRON
| Applecross, Lochcarron, and Shieldaig
| Highland
|-
! IV55
| ISLE OF SKYE
| Dunvegan
| Highland
|-
! IV56
| ISLE OF SKYE
| Struan
| Highland
|-
! IV63
| INVERNESS
| Drumnadrochit, Glenurquhart and Invermoriston
| Highland
|-
! style="background:#FFFFFF;"|IV99
| style="background:#FFFFFF;"|INVERNESS
| style="background:#FFFFFF;"|Jobcentre Plus
| style="background:#FFFFFF;"|non-geographic
|}

The postcode area had IV33, IV34 and IV35 covering in small easterly areas the post towns of Carron, Knockando and Rothes.  These were transferred to the post town of Aberlour, and in August 1994 recoded into AB38.

IV27 (Lairg) is the largest postcode area in the United Kingdom by area, at 1,393 square miles.

Map

See also
Postcode Address File
List of postcode areas in the United Kingdom

References

External links
Royal Mail's Postcode Address File
A quick introduction to Royal Mail's Postcode Address File (PAF)

Inverness
Postcode areas covering Scotland